Dan Wakefield (born May 21, 1932) is an American novelist, journalist and screenwriter.

His best-selling novels, Going All the Way (1970) and Starting Over (1973), were made into feature films.

He wrote the screenplay for Going All the Way, which starred Ben Affleck, Rachel Weisz and Rose McGowan.

He created the NBC prime time television series James at 15 (1977–78) and was story editor of the series (1977).

His other notable works include Island in the City: The World of Spanish Harlem (1959), a pioneering journalistic account of a Puerto Rican neighborhood in New York, and the memoir New York in the Fifties (2001), produced as a documentary film by Betsy Blankenbaker. His memoir, Returning: A Spiritual Journey (1988), was called by Bill Moyers "one of the most important memoirs of the spirit I have ever read". He edited and wrote the Introduction to Kurt Vonnegut Letters (2012). Wakefield received The Bernard DeVoto Fellowship at The Bread Loaf Writer Conference in 1958, a Nieman Fellowship in Journalism (1963–64) and a Rockefeller Grant in Writing, 1968.

Wakefield retired as writer in residence at Florida International University (1995–2009), where he received The Faculty Award for Mentorship. He moved back to his home town of Indianapolis in 2011.

Early life and education
Dan Wakefield was born in Indianapolis, Indiana, where his family lived in the Broad Ripple neighborhood.

He went to Public School #80 and Shortridge High School, where he began his writing career as a sports columnist for the school newspaper, The Shortridge Daily Echo, and was the school's sports correspondent for The Indianapolis Star. He worked summers during college in The Star sports department and as a general assignment reporter for The Grand Rapids Press.

He left Indianapolis in 1952 for New York City, where he graduated from Columbia College, with a B.A. with Honors in English, after having studied with the literary critics Mark Van Doren and Lionel Trilling, as well as the sociologist C. Wright Mills.

Career
He worked as a reporter after college on The Princeton Packet, New Jersey's oldest weekly, and left to become a research assistant for the sociologist C. Wright Mills, his professor at Columbia. His research duties left him time to begin his career as a freelance journalist, covering the Emmett Till murder trial in Mississippi for The Nation magazine, and continued to write for them from Israel in 1956, becoming a staff writer for the magazine on his return the same year. He also published in periodicals such as Dissent, Commonweal, Commentary, New World Writing, Harpers, Esquire, The Atlantic, The Yoga Journal, GQ and TV Guide.

On publication of his collection of articles and commentary Between The Lines (1966), The New York Times said he was "acknowledged to be one of the country's most perceptive and sensitive independent commentator-reporters". After his year as a Nieman Fellow, he moved to Beacon Hill in Boston, where he began writing for The Atlantic, writing the entire issue of the magazine for March 1968, called "Supernation at Peace and War", which then was published as a book. He became a contributing editor of The Atlantic (1968-1981).

He has taught writing at the University of Massachusetts at Boston, Emerson College, Boston University, The University of Illinois Journalism School and The Iowa Writers Workshop.

After publication of his memoir Returning, which began as an article in The New York Times Magazine, Wakefield began giving workshops on spiritual autobiography, based on the course he took at King's Chapel, originated by The Rev. Carl Scovel. Wakefield has led these workshops at churches, monasteries, synagogues, retreat centers, health spas, adult education centers and at Sing Sing prison, throughout the U.S. and in Northern Ireland and Mexico.

The Story of Your Life: Writing an Autobiography grew out of the workshops. His other books in this area include Expect a Miracle (1995) and The Hi-Jacking of Jesus (2010).

He edited and wrote the Introduction of the letters of his friend and fellow Shortridge High School graduate Kurt Vonnegut (Kurt Vonnegut Letters) as well as a collection of Vonnegut's graduation speeches and other related pieces (If This Isn’t Nice What Is?. . .).

In 2016, Open Road Media brought out all his five novels as well as his memoir, New York in the Fifties, as ebooks.

Personal life
During college, Wakefield became an atheist and did not return to church until 1980 when he went to a Christmas Eve service at King's Chapel, a Christian church in the Unitarian Universalist denomination in Boston.

Wakefield returned to Indianapolis to speak on a panel discussion of the work of Vonnegut at the Vonnegut Library and Museum in November 2011. A month later, he moved back to Indianapolis to live, thus contradicting Vonnegut's prediction in his review of Going All The Way in Life magazine: "Having written this book, Dan Wakefield will never be able to go back to Indianapolis. He will have to watch the 500 mile race on television." After moving back, Wakefield was inducted into The Indianapolis Public Schools Hall of Fame, The Shortridge High School Hall of Fame, The Indy Reads Literacy Leaders Hall of Fame, and received a Cultural Vision Award from  the news weekly, NUVO.

Awards
 Nieman Fellowship in Journalism
 Bernard DeVoto Fellowship
 Rockefeller Grant for Creative Arts
 National Endowment for the Arts Grant

Works

Books
 Island in the City (1959)
 Revolt in the South (1962)
 The Addict: An Anthology (1963)
 Between The Lines (1965)
 Supernation at Peace and War (1968)
 Going All The Way (1970)
 Starting Over (1973)
 All Her Children: The Making of a Soap Opera (1975)
 Home Free (1977)
 Under The Apple Tree (1982)
 Selling Out (1985)
 Returning: A Spiritual Journey (1988)
 The Story of Your Life: Writing a Spiritual Autobiography, (Beacon Press), (1990)
 New York in the Fifties (1992)
 Expect a Miracle (1995)
 Creating from the Spirit (1996)
 How Do We Know When It's God? (1999)
 Releasing the Creative Spirit (SkyLight Paths), (2001)
  Spiritually Incorrect: Finding God in All the Wrong Places, (SkyLight Paths), (2003)
 The Hijacking of Jesus: How the Religious Right Distorts Christianity and Promotes Prejudice and Hate  (Nation Books), (2006)
 If This Isn't Nice, What Is?: Advice to the Young (Seven Stories Press), (2014)
 Editor, Kurt Vonnegut Letters (Random House), (2012)
 Editor, If This Isn't Nice What Is? Vonnegut's Graduation Speeches, (Seven Stories Press), (2013)
 Editor, Complete Stories by Kurt Vonnegut (Seven Stories Press), (2017)

Films and television
 Creator/consultant, James at 15 (1977)
 Writer/co-producer, The Seduction of Miss Leona (1980)
 Writer, Going All the Way (1997)

References

External links
 Dan Wakefield, Facebook page
 Dan Wakefield, Twitter page
 Dan Wakefield website
 Dan Wakefield articles at The Nation
 

1932 births
Living people
American male journalists
Journalists from Indiana
American male novelists
American male screenwriters
American spiritual writers
American television writers
Columbia College (New York) alumni
Converts to Protestantism from atheism or agnosticism
Florida International University people
The Indianapolis Star people
The Nation (U.S. magazine) people
Nieman Fellows
Writers from Indianapolis
Writers from Urbana, Illinois
American male television writers
Screenwriters from Indiana
Novelists from Indiana
Novelists from Illinois
Screenwriters from Illinois
People from Beacon Hill, Boston
Shortridge High School alumni